is a Japanese talent agency and entertainment production company headquartered in Higashigotanda, Shinagawa, Tokyo. It was found in 1968 by Ryoji Asai, who at the time was a manager working under Nakagawa Production, a talent agency for actors. Ryoji Asai was also responsible for scouting comedian talents such as Kinichi Hagimoto and Jirō Sakagami. Asai Kikaku is currently one of the largest talent agencies in Tokyo with a focus on variety tarento and comedians.

Asai Kikaku also partakes in casting and assistance in production for media, television and films. Notable examples include Sengoku Basara – Moonlight Party (2012) and Gaki Rock (2014).

In October 2018, Ryoji Asai died and his son Ryoichi Asai succeeded the company.

Notable talents

Comedians
Kinichi Hagimoto
Kazuki Kosakai
Kyaeen (Udo Suzuki, Hiroyuki Amano)
Anzen Manzai (Miyazon, Arapon)
Nagareboshi (Chuei, Shinichiro Takiue)
Tsutomu Sekine
Zun (Kazuki Iiyo, Yasu)

Others
Reiko Hayama (actress)
Ami Inamura (television personality)
Mari Kumamoto (pianist)
Koichi Nakano (former racing cyclist)
Daishi Nobuyuki (former sumo wrestler)
Neko Oikawa (lyricist)
Atsuko Okamoto (actress)
Hideo Tokoro (mixed martial artist)
Yuka Yoshida (former professional tennis player)

Former notable talents
Hiroshi Aramata (author)
Mackenyu Arata (actor)
Mayuko Arisue (model)
Sonny Chiba (actor)
Koriki Choshu (comedian)
Mika Katsumura (actress)
Midori Kinouchi (idol)
Yū Mizushima (voice actress)
Kurama Tatsuya (former sumo wrestler)
Jirō Sakagami (former comedian)
Sugi-chan (comedian)
Kaoru Sugita (actress)
Misako Tanaka (actress)

References

External links 

 Official website

Talent agencies based in Tokyo
Mass media companies established in 1968
Mass media companies based in Tokyo
Entertainment companies of Japan
1968 establishments in Japan
Japanese talent agencies